The 2011 Internazionali Femminili di Palermo was a professional tennis tournament played on clay courts. It was the 24th edition of the tournament which was part of the 2011 WTA Tour. It took place in Palermo, Italy between 11 and 18 July 2011.

WTA entrants

Seeds

 1 Rankings are as of July 4, 2011.

Other entrants
The following players received wildcards into the singles main draw:
  Silvia Albano
  Anna Floris
  Anastasia Grymalska

The following players received entry from the qualifying draw:

  Elena Bovina
  Sesil Karatantcheva
  Karin Knapp
  Ani Mijačika

The following player received entry from a lucky loser spot:
  Lara Arruabarrena-Vecino

Champions

Singles

 Anabel Medina Garrigues def.  Polona Hercog, 6–3, 6–2.
It was Medina Garrigues' second title of the year and 11th of her career. It was her fifth win at Palermo, also winning in 2001, 2004, 2005, and 2006.

Doubles

 Sara Errani /  Roberta Vinci def.  Andrea Hlaváčková /  Klára Zakopalová, 7–5, 6–1.

External links
Official Website

Internazionali Femminili di Palermo
Internazionali Femminili di Palermo
2011 in Italian women's sport
Torneo